Alfred Price (5 January 1862 – 21 March 1942) was an English cricketer active from 1884 to 1887 who played for Lancashire and Nottinghamshire. He was born in Ruddington and died in Oldham. He appeared in seven first-class matches as a righthanded batsman, scoring 110 runs with a highest score of 37 and held seven catches. His father was the Nottinghamshire player and umpire, Walter Price.

Notes

1862 births
1942 deaths
English cricketers
Lancashire cricketers
Nottinghamshire cricketers
Liverpool and District cricketers
North v South cricketers